Abingdon Male Academy was a military academy of the United States of America. One notable alumnus was Judge Jeremiah Watkins Clapp, who served in the 2nd Confederate States Congress from 1862 to 1864. It is now defunct and its property is now the site of the Abingdon, Virginia William King Regional Arts Center.

Sources

Abingdon, Virginia Website

Defunct United States military academies
Education in Washington County, Virginia
Defunct schools in Virginia